Dendrotettix is a genus of spur-throated grasshoppers in the family Acrididae. There are at least three described species in Dendrotettix.

Species
These three species belong to the genus Dendrotettix:
 Dendrotettix australis (Morse, 1907) i c g b (scrub pine grasshopper)
 Dendrotettix quercus Packard, 1890 i c g b (post oak grasshopper)
 Dendrotettix zimmermanni (Saussure, 1861) i c g b (Carolina oak grasshopper)
Data sources: i = ITIS, c = Catalogue of Life, g = GBIF, b = Bugguide.net

References

Further reading

 
 

Melanoplinae
Articles created by Qbugbot